Precision Propellers LLC, founded in 1979 by Jeff Johnson, was an American manufacturer of wooden propellers for homebuilt and ultralight aircraft. Once established at Vernal, Utah, the company headquarters was last located in Gold Canyon, Arizona.

See also
List of aircraft propeller manufacturers

References

External links 
Company website archives on Archive.org

Aircraft propeller manufacturers
Aerospace companies of the United States